Chopin is a single-ingredient vodka, 4 times distilled from either potatoes, rye or wheat. It is produced by Siedlce-based Podlaska Wytwórnia Wódek Polmos. Chopin was first introduced to North America in 1997. The production is done in small batches. The producer claims seven pounds of potatoes are used to make every bottle of Chopin.

The vodka is named after the famous Romantic composer Frédéric Chopin.

Chopin potato vodka has been submitted to a number of international spirit ratings for evaluation, including the San Francisco World Spirits Competition, Wine Enthusiast, and the Beverage Testing Institute.  Outcomes have generally been favorable, particularly in the latest years.  For instance, between 2006 and 2011, Chopin potato vodka earned one double gold, three gold, and two silver medals from the San Francisco World Spirits Competition.  Proof66's aggregate rating, which incorporates these scores and others, puts the spirit in the Top 90th percentile among all rated vodkas.

See also
List of vodkas

References

External links
Vodka Chopin
Polmos Siedlce
Proof66.com Ratings Aggregator 

Polish brands
Polish vodkas
Products introduced in 1992